Raffaele Calabro (10 July 1940 – 4 August 2017) was a Roman Catholic bishop.

Ordained to the priesthood in 1964, Calabro served as bishop of the Roman Catholic Diocese of Andria, Italy, from 1989 to 2016.

Notes

1940 births
2017 deaths
20th-century Italian Roman Catholic bishops
21st-century Italian Roman Catholic bishops
People from Andria